Plectopyloidea is a taxonomic superfamily of air-breathing land snails, terrestrial pulmonate gastropod mollusks in the suborder Helicina.

Families
The superfamily Plectopyloidea consists of the following families (according to the taxonomy of the Gastropoda by Bouchet & Rocroi, 2005):
Family Plectopylidae Möllendorff, 1898
Family Corillidae Pilsbry, 1905 - with only one genus Corilla
Family Sculptariidae Degner, 1923 - with only one genus Sculptaria

Distribution
Plectopylidae ranges across large parts of southeast Asia from Nepal to southern Japan. Corillidae is the mainly Sri Lankan family. Sculptariidae is the African family.

Description
The Plectopylidae differ from the Corillidae by the presence of one or two vertical (= perpendicular to the suture) lamellae on the parietal wall, approximately a quarter to a half whorl behind the aperture. In contrast, the Corillidae have only horizontal (= parallel with the suture) parietal plicae (in Corilla all plicae may be absent).

References
This article incorporates Creative Commons (CC-BY-4.0) text from the reference

Further reading
  McMichael, D.F. 1959. A new genus and species of land snail from Nth. Queensland. Journal of the Malacological Society of Australia 1: 31–32 [13 Nov. 1959]
 Smith, B.J. 1992. Non-Marine Mollusca. In, Houston, W.W.K (ed.). Zoological Catalogue of Australia. Canberra : Australian Government Publishing Service Vol. 8 pp. xii 408.
 Solem, A. 1973. Craterodiscus McMichael, 1959, a camaenid land shell from Queensland. Journal of the Malacological Society of Australia 2: 377–385
 Solem, A. 1973. Convergence in pulmonate radulae. The Veliger 15: 165–171
 Stanisic, J. 1998. Family Corillidae. pp. 1110–1112 in Beesley, P.L., Ross, G.J.B. & Wells, A. (eds). Mollusca: The Southern Synthesis. Fauna of Australia. Melbourne : CSIRO Publishing Vol. 5 Part B pp. 565–1234.
 Tillier, S. 1989. Comparative morphology, phylogeny and classification of land snails and slugs (Gastropoda: Pulmonata: Stylommatophora). Malacologia 30: 1–303

External links

Stylommatophora